Hartmut Bossel (born 3 March 1935) is a German environmental scientist and systems scientist.  Bossel was a professor of environmental systems analysis and director of the Scientific Center for Environmental Systems Research and Environmental Systems Analysis Group at the University of Kassel, Germany, until his retirement in 1997.

Bossel collaboratively developed a number of computer simulation models and decision support systems in the following areas: energy supply policy, global dynamics, orientation of behavior, agricultural policy, forest dynamics and management, sustainable development, and indicator systems.  Bossel also wrote a number of textbooks on the modeling and simulation of dynamic systems, social change, future paths, and sustainable development.

Bossel and co-author Florentin Krause are credited with coining the term Energiewende, used to describe the change in German energy policy from 2010 onwards, in 1980.

Life 

Bossel graduated from the Technische Universität Darmstadt in 1961 with a diploma in mechanical engineering (aeronautical sciences).  He worked at the Northrop Corporation in Los Angeles until 1963.  He was an assistant professor at the University of California, Berkeley, where he was awarded a PhD in engineering (aeronautical sciences) in 1967.  From 1967 to 1972, he was a professor of mechanical engineering at the University of California, Santa Barbara.

After returning to Germany in 1972, Bossel worked at the Fraunhofer Institute for Systems and Innovation Research (ISI) in Karlsruhe and from 1978 at the Institute of Systems Analysis and Forecasting (ISP Eduard Pestel) in Hannover.  In 1979, he was appointed a professor at the University of Kassel where he held the chair of Environmental Systems Analysis and was the director of the Scientific Center for Environmental Systems Research and Environmental Systems Analysis Group.  He was a member of the Balaton Group from its inception.  Bossel completed several research sabbaticals abroad, including in the US, France, the former Yugoslavia, the Soviet Union, China, Malaysia, Indonesia, and New Zealand.

Bossel married in 1961 and has three children.

Selected bibliography

See also 

 Computer simulation
 Environmental systems analysis
 Integrated assessment modelling
 Sustainable development
 Systems science
 Systems theory

References

External links 

 Website of Hartmut Bossel (in English)

1935 births
Living people
Scientists from Braunschweig
Sustainability advocates
Systems scientists
Technische Universität Darmstadt alumni
UC Berkeley College of Engineering alumni
UC Berkeley College of Engineering faculty
University of California, Santa Barbara faculty
Academic staff of the University of Kassel
German expatriates in the United States